National Tertiary Route 904, or just Route 904 (or ) is a National Road Route of Costa Rica, located in the Guanacaste province.

Description
In Guanacaste province the route covers Santa Cruz canton (Santa Cruz, Veintisiete de Abril, Cuajiniquil districts).

References

Highways in Costa Rica